The Khibiny Mountains is one of the two main mountain ranges of the Kola Peninsula, Russia, within the Arctic Circle, located between Imandra and Umbozero lakes. The range is also known as Khibiny Massif, Khibinsky Mountains, Khibinsky Tundras, Khibins or Khibiny. The Khibiny National Park was set up in 2018.

Geography

The Khibiny Massif are the highest mountains of the Kola Peninsula, a large peninsula extending from northern Russia into the Barents and White seas. It is rich in minerals due to the removal of a layer of soil during the last ice age.

The Khibiny Massif is of oval shape of about 1,300 km2. and occupies the central part of the peninsula at a relative elevation of 900–1000 m above the surrounding plain. The mountains are not particularly high; the two highest peaks are the Yudychvumchorr, which stands , and the Chasnachorr, which stands . The mountains form the shape of a horseshoe topped by a high plateau, drained by a series of deep canyons. The peaks are of plateau type, with steep slopes, with glaciers, icefields and snowfields in some places. The overall terrain is alpine tundra.

The second, and similar mountain range of the Kola Peninsula, the Lovozero Tundras, is located about 5 km east from the easternmost point of Khibiny, separated from it by Lake Umbozero.

The Khibiny range is extremely rich in minerals, mainly apatite and nepheline ores. 477 valid minerals have been reported and 108 of those are type localities or minerals first described in the Khibiny. The range is also  seismically active.

Khibiny mountains are mostly uninhabited, except for one of the world's richest mineral quarries. One of the minerals discovered there is reported to have a potential as a nuclear waste radioactivity absorbent. By the foot of the massif the cities of Apatity and Kirovsk are situated.

Climate
Khibiny have an Arctic-moderate climate, with an average winter temperature of −5 °C (23 °F). However, the temperature can potentially drop to −30 °C (−22 °F) during the night. The Gulf Stream, which brings warmer water to the Kolsky Peninsula from the north, moderates the climate, making it slightly warmer than other Arctic regions.

Toponyms in Khibins

Mount Aikuaiventchorr
Mount Eveslogchorr
Hackman Valley
Kaskasnyunchorr
Khibinpakhchorr
Mount Koashkar
Mount Koashva
Kuniok Valley
Mount Maly Mannepakhk
Mount Kukisvumchorr
Marchenko Peak
Mount Rasvumchorr
Mount Restin'yun
Mount Yukspor
Loparskaya Valley
Mount Nyorkpakhk (Niorkpakhk, N'orkpukhk, N'Yourpakhk)
Mount Partomchorr
Petrelius River
Mount Rischorr
Mount Takhtarvumchorr
Tuliylukht Bay
Vuonnemiok River
Imandra Lake
Yum'egor Pass
Mount Vud'yavrchorr (with botanical garden of polar-alpine flora)

References

External links
 
 Guide to the Khibiny
 hibiny.info 
 Khibiny geology and minerals

Mountain ranges of Russia
Mountains of Murmansk Oblast